George William Richard Richardson (15 February 1899 – 13 November 1963) was an English footballer who made 34 appearances in the Football League playing for Lincoln City, Sheffield United and Bournemouth & Boscombe Athletic. He played as a left half. He also played in the Midland League for Lincoln, and in non-league football for Boston Town.

Notes

References

1899 births
1963 deaths
People from Gainsborough, Lincolnshire
English footballers
Association football wing halves
Lincoln City F.C. players
Sheffield United F.C. players
AFC Bournemouth players
Boston Town F.C. (1920s) players
Midland Football League players
English Football League players